Sir John Moore (11 June 1620 – 2 June 1702) was a British politician. He was the Member of Parliament for the City of London from 15 May 1685 to 9 January 1687, and Lord Mayor of London, 1681–82. He also invested in the slave trade.

Biography

He was born in Snarestone Lodge near Snarestone, Leicestershire, on 11 June 1620, the son of Charles Moore Esq., a local landowner and owner of Appleby Hall, Appleby Magna, and Cecily Yates. Snarestone Lodge was the Lodge house to his mother's family estate: Snarestone Hall (now Demolished)

As his elder brother, also called Charles, was expected to inherit the family estates, as second son, John Moore was expected to make his own way in the world. He, and subsequent generations of younger sons, went to London to make a living as merchants. John Moore was active in the lead business, then in trade with East India, and became Master of the Grocer's Company.

Originally he was a non-conformist, but after entering the Church of England he was able to take a seat as alderman for Walbrook. He was knighted in 1672, and elected Sheriff of London that same year. He was a representative of the Court party in the reign of Charles II, and active in supporting its influence in the City of London. He was elected one of the representative from the city to the 1685 Parliament.

Links to the slave trade 
Moore was a Member of Court of Assistants (essentially the board of directors) of the slave-trading Royal African Company, 1687–9 and 1700–1702, and was an investor in the Guinea trade. He was a shareholder in the East India Company, which was involved in the Indian Ocean slave trade.

Legacy 
He died aged 81, on 2 June 1702, leaving his estates, worth £80,000 (£6,247,200 today), to his two nephews.

Moore contributed large sums to the erection of schools at Christ's Hospital, and founded a free grammar school in Appleby Magna.

Politically, he was a Tory and, upon becoming Lord Mayor, was celebrated in song as the man who would keep the commoners in their place:

A statue of Moore by Grinling Gibbons was erected at Christ's Hospital in London, but was moved in 1902 to Christ's Hospitals School, Horsham, Sussex.

References

External links
 "The Moores of Appleby Parva" Richard Dunmore, Appleby Magna's History, applebymagna.org
 "Sir John Moore Foundation"

1620 births
1702 deaths
People from North West Leicestershire District
Businesspeople from London
17th-century lord mayors of London
Sheriffs of the City of London
English knights
English philanthropists
18th-century English people
Members of the Parliament of England for the City of London
English MPs 1685–1687
17th-century philanthropists
English slave traders